Philippines Songs is a music record chart in the Philippines, compiled by Billboard since February 2022. The chart is updated every Tuesday on Billboards website. The chart was announced on February 14, 2022, as part of Billboards Hits of the World chart collection, ranking the top 25 songs weekly in more than 40 countries around the globe. This is the first local Billboard chart in the Philippines since the discontinuation of the Philippine Hot 100 along with four other charts after Billboard Philippines ceased its operation for an undisclosed reason on January 15, 2018.

The first number-one song on the chart was "Pano" by Zack Tabudlo on the issue dated February 19, 2022. The chart's current number-one song is "Die for You" by The Weeknd and Ariana Grande, on the week ending on March 18, 2023. "Ikaw Lang" by Nobita made its mark as the longest-running song on the chart with 57 weeks, still ranking as of the week ending on March 18, 2023.

Methodology 
The chart tracks songs' performance from Friday to Thursday. Chart rankings are based on digital downloads from full-service digital music retailers (sales from direct-to-consumer sites such as an individual artist's store are excluded) and online streaming occurring in the Philippines during the tracking period. All data are provided by Luminate Data, formerly MRC Data.

List of number-one songs

2022 

In 2022, eleven acts achieved their first Philippine number-one single in the Philippines Songs chart, either as a lead artist or a featured guest: Zack Tabudlo, Anees, Troye Sivan, BTS, Joji, Charlie Puth, Jungkook, Blackpink, Adie, Janine Berdin, and Taylor Swift. Out of the ten number-one songs in the calendar year, six singles debuted at the top spot. Zack Tabudlo's "Pano" became the first song to debut and peak at the summit, making it the first OPM chart-topper and Tabudlo as the first Filipino to reach number one in Philippines Songs. It was also the longest-running single of the year, having topped the chart for eleven consecutive weeks. Taylor Swift's "Anti-Hero" led the top place for nine weeks, the longest stay by a female artist on top. Charlie Puth's "Left and Right" topped the chart for eight consecutive weeks, while Anees' "Sun and Moon" spent five weeks at the number-one spot.

Adie and Janine Berdin's "Mahika" is the first Filipino duet to reach the summit, setting the record for the longest climb to number one in its 17th week and for Berdin as the first Filipina to lead the chart. Blackpink's "Shut Down" debuted at number one in October, ending the run of Blackpink's own "Pink Venom", both from their album Born Pink. The feat made Blackpink the first act to replace themselves at number one, and the only act in 2022 to produce multiple number-one songs.

2023

Top-five singles

2022 

Thirty-nine singles reached the top five of the chart initially in 2022. Thirty-three acts scored a Philippine top five hit during the year for the first time, with eleven Filipino acts either as a lead artist or featured artist. Taylor Swift scored six top-five singles during the year, the most among all other artists. All six songs are from her album Midnights, breaking the record for the most Philippine top-five songs from one album. Blackpink had the second most top-five singles with four, all from their album Born Pink. Among local acts, Zack Tabudlo had the most top-five singles in the calendar year with three, followed by Arthur Nery with two.

"Mahika" by Adie and Janine Berdin was the longest-running top-five single of the year, spending twenty-seven weeks in the tier. "Angel Baby" by Troye Sivan had the second most weeks in the top five of the chart with twenty-one, the best among international acts in 2022.

Key

2023 
An asterisk (*) represents that a song is in the top five as of the issue dated March 18, 2023.

References

External links
 Current Philippines Songs chart
 Billboard charts 

Billboard charts
2022 establishments in the Philippines
Philippine record charts